Richard Evan Zieff (born November 1, 1961), also known as Danny Katiana, is an American actor and voice-over coach.

Career
His career in voice-overs dates back to the mid-1980s. He has also appeared in such films as Mississippi Burning, Nick of Time and Terminator 3: Rise of the Machines. He has also done the voice of Shusuke Amagai in season 9 of Bleach as well as Simon in Steamboy.

He voiced Mr. Nosey (as Mr. Nosy) and Mr. Nervous in the American dub of The Mr. Men Show and Rocket Cat in the American dub of Poppy Cat credit under the pseudonym Danny Katiana.

As of 2014, he voiced Spike the Dog on Warner Bros. Animation's The Tom and Jerry Show.

In 2021, Zieff provided the voice of Lynn Loud Sr.'s father Leonard "Gramps" Loud in The Loud House.

Personal life
Rick teaches a voice course in Los Angeles.

Filmography

Anime

Film

Television

Video games

External links

References 

1961 births
Living people
20th-century American male actors
21st-century American male actors
American male film actors
American male television actors
American male video game actors
American male voice actors
People from Weston, Massachusetts